The Irbit Bike Show (Ирбитский байк слёт) is held every year at the end of July. It is organised by the local bike club as a celebration of the town's importance as a manufacturer of heavy motorcycles (see IMZ-Ural) in both the Soviet Union and Russia. Thousands of riders from throughout the Sverdlovsk region and other parts of Russia attend, and increasingly more foreign riders are attending.

Culture of Sverdlovsk Oblast